Pacific Beach is a neighborhood in San Diego, bounded by La Jolla to the north, Mission Beach and Mission Bay to the south, Interstate 5 to the east and the Pacific Ocean to the west. While formerly largely populated by young people, surfers, and college students, because of rising property and rental costs the population is gradually becoming older and more affluent. "P.B.," as it is known as by local residents, is home to one of San Diego's more developed nightlife scenes, with a great variety of bars, eateries, and clothing stores located along Garnet Avenue and Mission Boulevard.

History
Before European contact, the area was settled by the Kumeyaay people, who built a large village then known as Hamo, or Jamo, on the banks of Rose Creek at the entrance of Rose Canyon.

As with many California cities, the history of San Diego's development can be traced back to the completion of a cross-country railroad in 1885. The town developed during the boom years between 1886 and 1888 by D. C. Reed, A. G. Gassen, Charles W. Pauley, R. A. Thomas, and O. S. Hubbell. It was Hubbell who "cleared away the grainfields, pitched a tent, mapped out the lots, hired an auctioneer and started to work". A railway connected Pacific Beach with downtown San Diego starting in 1889, and was extended to La Jolla in 1894.

Early landmarks and attractions in Pacific Beach included an asbestos factory (established in 1888), a race track, and the San Diego College of Letters (1887-1891), none of which survive today. At the turn of the century, lemon growing and packing dominated the local economy. In 1910, the San Diego Army and Navy Academy, a preparatory school, was established in an old College building; in 1922 a public high school followed and a junior high in 1930. In 1927, Crystal Pier opened; the Roxy Movie theater opened in 1943 to cater to a population that grew five times during World War II. The postwar period saw the establishment of many hotels: the Bahia (1953), the Catamaran (1959), and Vacation Village (1965). High-rise construction in nearby Mission Bay led to the establishment of a 30-foot height limitation for buildings in 1972, an ordinance still in effect. Prominent boardwalk Ocean Avenue was closed in 1982 and became a park.

In 1902, lots sold for between $350–700 for oceanfront property. By 1950, the population of Pacific Beach reached 30,000 and the average home sold for $12,000. Nonetheless, a small number of farms remained. Today, homes can sell for millions of dollars.

In 1945, over 1,900 residents petitioned to remove the name of William Payne from the middle school because they did not believe that a black teacher deserved to be there. At the time, only two black families owned property in the neighborhood. In 2021, following a wave of name changes in the wake of the murder of George Floyd, the San Diego Unified School Board voted to rename a joint-use field at the middle school after Payne and his wife Fannie.

The United States Navy operated an anti-aircraft training center at Pacific Beach during World War II. During the 1960s, development continued to increase with the city's investment in Mission Bay Park, including the developments of the Islandia, Vacation Village and Hilton Hotels. In 1964, Sea World opened south of Pacific Beach.

The original name of this feature was "Bay Point" and today one may still find a USGS bench mark and associated RM (DC1025, DC1026 respectively) with that name there.  The "Bay Point Formation" is the name of a local rock strata first found and described there.

Geography

The beach

The beach stretches for miles from the Mission Bay jetty to the cliffs of La Jolla. The boardwalk, officially called Ocean Front Walk/Ocean Boulevard, is a pedestrian walkway that runs approximately 3.2 miles along the beach from the end of Law St. in the north down into Mission Beach, ending at the mouth of Mission Bay in the south. There are numerous local shops, bars, hotels, and restaurants along the boardwalk, and it is generally crowded with pedestrians, cyclists, rollerbladers, skateboarders and shoppers. Adjacent to the boardwalk is the Crystal Pier, a public pier and hotel at the west end of Garnet Avenue. San Diego City Council banned the use of all electric-motor scooters in December 2019.

Streets

The streets in Pacific Beach were renamed several times before receiving their current designations in 1900. The primary north-south street running parallel to the beach is Mission Blvd., with the streets named after late 19th century federal officials, then incrementing in alphabetical order as they move further from the coast: Bayard, Cass, Dawes, Everts, Fanuel, Gresham, Haines, Ingraham, Jewell, Kendall, Lamont, Morrell, Noyes, Olney, Pendleton, Quincy, and Randall. Mission Boulevard was formerly Allison Street, being the "A" street of the series. Ingraham was initially named Broadway (1887), then was changed to Izard (1900), back to Broadway (1907) and finally settled as Ingraham Street in 1913.

The east-west streets are mostly named after precious stones. Starting at the north end of Mission Blvd. and heading south, the streets are:

 Agate
 Turquoise
 Sapphire
 Tourmaline - see Tourmaline Surfing Park
 Opal
 Loring
 Wilbur
 Beryl
 Law
 Chalcedony - pronounced locally "chal-SED-nee", unlike the stone: "kal-SED-n-ee"
 Missouri
 Diamond
 Emerald
 Felspar - an alternate spelling of "Feldspar" that has fallen out of use
 Garnet - pronounced locally with the second syllable accented, unlike the pronunciation of the stone
 Hornblend - spelled differently from the mineral hornblende
 Grand
 Thomas
 Reed
 Oliver
 Pacific Beach Drive

Climate

Pacific Beach has a semi-arid subtropical climate (Köppen climate classification: BSk) with warm-summer Mediterranean characteristics. The sun shines more than 300 days each year in Pacific Beach, and rainfall averages less than 11 inches per year.

Parks and recreation

In addition to bordering the Pacific Ocean and Mission Bay Park, Pacific Beach includes Kate Sessions Park and the Pacific Beach Recreation Center. Kate Sessions Park has a playground, large lawn with ocean views, and a many acre unmaintained area used for hiking and mountain biking. Fanuel Street Park is a popular bay-front park with playground equipment suitable for toddler and school-age children. Rose Creek, which flows through Pacific Beach before emptying into Mission Bay, provides open space and a rich wetland area.

Surfing 
Pacific Beach is open to all surfers. The level of difficulty is intermediate and can be surfed all year. The south wind makes surfing best though in the fall and winter. Many surfers wear dry or wetsuits as water is in the high 50s in the winter and high 60s to low 70s in the summer.

Organizations
The nonprofit Pacific Beach Town Council promotes the area and organizes community events. The Pacific Beach Planning Group advises the city on land use and other issues. The Pacific Beach and Mission Bay Visitor Center provides information on the Pacific Beach Town Council, special events, lodging, dining, and Pacific Beach history. Service clubs include Kiwanis, Rotary, Lions Club, Girl Scouts, Pacific Beach Woman's Club, Surf Club, Friends of the PB Library, PB Garden Club, and Toastmasters.

Education
Pacific Beach public schools are part of the San Diego Unified School District. They include Mission Bay Senior High School, Pacific Beach Middle School, Pacific Beach Elementary, Kate Sessions Elementary, Barnard Elementary, and Crown Point Junior Music Academy .

Media
Pacific Beach is serviced in print by the daily San Diego Union Tribune and the weekly Beach & Bay Press.

In popular culture
In John Dos Passos's The 42nd Parallel (1930), Fainy "Mac" McCreary briefly lives in a bungalow in Pacific Beach with his wife Maisie and their daughter Rose.

Notable people
 Kate Sessions, Landscape Architect
 Frank Bompensiero, mobster
 Donna Frye, former city council representative and mayoral candidate
 Skip Frye, professional surfer
 Adam Gnade, musician-novelist
 Tony Gwynn Jr., former outfielder in the MLB
 Robert Hays, actor, known for role in Airplane
 Pauly Shore, actor, former MTV host
 Eddie Vedder, musician
 Dinesh D’Souza, political commentator
 Vic Fuentes, musician
Mark Whitney Mehran Owner of Hotrodsurf
Mark Dice, a YouTuber

Gallery

See also 

Tourmaline Surfing Park at the north end of Pacific Beach
 List of beaches in San Diego County
 List of California state parks

References

Beaches of Southern California
Entertainment districts in California
Neighborhoods in San Diego
Populated coastal places in California
Restaurant districts and streets in the United States
Beaches of San Diego County, California